Hicks Time is an album of solo performances by jazz pianist John Hicks.

Music and recording
All but two of the compositions are by Hicks. The other two – "Reminds Me" and "Jest a Little" – were by Oliver Lake, who was also the album's co-producer, along with Richard Franklin. "Redd's Blues" is a tribute to pianist Freddie Redd.

Release and reception
The album was released by Passin' Thru Records, around 1998. Hicks' playing was described by the JazzTimes reviewer as ranging "from the lush 19th century Romantic tradition through the vast-American-plains spaciousness of Aaron Copland, while also ingeniously incorporating the swinging phrasing of classic jazz and the challenging twists and turns of post-bop, as epitomized by longtime influence John Coltrane."

Track listing
"Naima's Love Song"
"Peanut Butter"
"Hicks' Time"
"April Eyes"
"Redd's Blues"
"Reminds Me"
"Jest a Little"
"Two Heartbeats"
"Heart to Heart"
"Steadfast"
"After the Morning"

Personnel
John Hicks – piano

References

John Hicks (jazz pianist) albums
Solo piano jazz albums